Medrow is a village in the municipality of Nossendorf in the countryside of Mecklenburgische Seenplatte in the northeast of Germany. About 150 people live here.

Geography 

Medrow is north of the municipality of Nossendorf. Around the village are the forests "Spitzeck" and "Kronforrest". Near Medrow are three little rivers: Red Bridge River, Kronriver and Castleriver.

History 
The village was founded in 1242 as "villam mederowe". It was a castle built by Slav settlers. Between 1648 and 1815, Medrow belonged to Sweden and Pomerania and was part of the municipality of Nehringen. In this time it was governed from the Sweden.

Villages in Mecklenburg-Western Pomerania